Garras is a village in the parish of Mawgan-in-Meneage (where the 2011 census was included ), in west Cornwall, England, UK.

References

Villages in Cornwall